"We Don't Have to Look Back Now" is the third single by post-grunge group Puddle of Mudd off of their album Famous. The single has been released on the radio and has charted on both rock charts, but the date of release for the single is not currently known. It has charted in New Zealand at #32 on the Top 40 Singles Chart.

Background
The song, which was written by Tony Fagenson and Max Collins, was originally intended to be recorded by Eve 6 

In an interview with the Journal Star, singer Wes Scantlin added that "It was really nice to go into the studio with those guys and really, really super fast get it done. (Because) those guys are like professional guys and (expletive)"

Music video
The music video was shot in Los Angeles and shows lead singer Wes Scantlin singing forwards, while the video is playing backwards. During the video it shows a couple, with another girl having an interest in the boyfriend. The video concludes with the boyfriend leaving his girlfriend for the girl more suited to him.

References

External links

Puddle of Mudd songs
2008 singles
Songs written by Max Collins (musician)
Songs written by Tony Fagenson
2007 songs
Geffen Records singles
Song recordings produced by Jack Joseph Puig